Evelin Viktória Kocsis (born 8 June 2006) is a Hungarian rhythmic gymnast. She won the first continental medal for Hungary in rhythmic gymnastics.

Career 
Evelin debuted internationally at the 1st Junior World Championships in Moscow, after having suffered a foot fracture a few weeks prior, along her teammates Szofia Bernat and Blanka Krasznay, she performed with ball and ribbon, being 6th in teams, 13th with ball and 6th in the ribbon final.

in 2020 she competed with Eva Blanka Gyulai, Blanka Krasznay and senior Fanni  Pigniczki at the European Championships in Kyiv, she ended 5th with rope, 7th with ball, 28th with ribbon and won an historical bronze with clubs, scoring 22.900 that put her behind Daria Atamanov and Yelyzaveta Zorkina.

She took part in the two April stages of the 2022 World Cup: in Sofia (5th in the All-Around, 7th with hoop, 4th with ball, 14th with clubs and 8th with ribbon) and Baku (16th in the All-Around, 23rd with hoop, 19th with ball, 8th with clubs and 31st with ribbon).

Achievements 

 First Hungarian rhythmic gymnast to win a medal in an individual apparatus final at the European Championships.

Routine music information

References 

-->

2006 births
Living people
Hungarian rhythmic gymnasts
People from Budapest
Sportspeople from Budapest
Medalists at the Rhythmic Gymnastics European Championships